Cultural framework is a term used in social science to explain traditions, value systems, myths and symbols that are common in a given society. A given society may have multiple cultural frameworks (for example, United States society has different cultural frameworks for its white and African American populations). Usually cultural frameworks are mixed; as certain individuals or entire groups can be familiar with many cultural frameworks.

There is an important relation between cultural frameworks and ideologies, as most successful ideologies are closely connected to cultural frameworks of societies they spread in. Cultural framework should not, however, be confused with ideology, as those concepts are separate. For example, in Nazi Germany, Nazism was an ideology, while religious beliefs, patriotism and traditions dating back to Germanic and Frankish tribes were part of the German cultural framework.

References
 Todd Landman, Neil Robinson, The SAGE handbook of comparative politics, SAGE Publications Ltd, 2009, p. 329

Framework